The Karaoke King is a 2007 comedy film directed by Dan Mackler and JJ Ruscella. The film is loosely based on William Shakespeare's play, Julius Caesar.

Plot
It revolves around a fictional bar named Lil's in Central Florida, known as the birthplace of karaoke in the United States. For as long as anyone can remember, one man named Eddie Bowman has won the weekly Wednesday night karaoke competition.  The film follows one fateful night where Eddie battles between his long-time girlfriend, Nikki, and his long-time nemesis, Rupert Goldfine to determine who is going to be the next reigning Karaoke King.

Cast
 Ed Donovan as the Bar owner
 Ken Wilder as Eddie Bowman
 Anil Kumar as Rupert D. Goldfine
 Lisa K. Bryant as Nikki Derringer
 David Knoell as Devon Smallwood
 Darlin Barry as Lil Derringer
 Annie Meisels as Jenny Mae Mayweather
 Aaron Kirkpatrick as Billy Mayweather
 Brian Vernon as Harold DuPont
 John Archer Lundgren as The Colonel
 Hank Stone as Cooter
 John Wayne Schaffer as Monty
 Keston John as KJ Diggs
 Donté Bonner as KJ Spins
 Ron Zarr as Miss Fuji
 Sam Singhause as Carl Derringer/Young Miss Fuji
 Linda Landry as Young Lil
 Tad Ingram as Jared/Health Inspector
 Jenny Ashman as Madeline
 Giancarlo Damiani as Manny
 Ayla Harrison as Patrick
 J.J. Ruscella as Herman
 Chris Niess as Nelson
 Fieli Deurs as Taka
 Amanda Clark as Melissa

Many of the film's cast and crew included faculty and students from University of Central Florida.

External links

Shirt Room Karaoke

Karaoke
2007 films
2000s musical films
2007 comedy-drama films
2000s English-language films
Films based on Julius Caesar (play)